HMS Sapphire was a  protected cruiser built for the Royal Navy in the first decade of the 20th century. She saw active service in World War I and was sold for scrap in 1921.

Design and description
They displaced  and their crew consisted of 313 officers and other ranks.

Sapphire was fitted with a pair of four-cylinder vertical triple-expansion steam engines, each driving one shaft, using steam provided by 10 water-tube boilers.

The main armament of the Topaze class consisted of a dozen quick-firing (QF)  guns. One gun each was mounted on the forecastle and the quarterdeck. The remaining ten guns were placed port and starboard amidships. They also carried eight QF 3-pounder Hotchkiss guns and two above water 18-inch (450 mm) torpedo tubes.

Construction
She was laid down in January 1904 at Palmers in their Jarrow shipyard, launched on 17 March 1904 and completed in February 1905.

Service 
Sapphire was commissioned on 2 July 1914 at Chatham Dock, Kent, before moving out into Kethole Reach, in the estuary of the Medway. On 16 July, Sapphire set sail from Sheerness Docks, Kent, for Spithead, Hampshire, where she took part in the Royal Fleet Review on 20 July.

On 8 January 1918, Sapphire arrived at Aden where Commander W. F. Sells joined from HMS Minto and took over command.

Sapphire was sold to TW Ward Ltd for breaking up at Grays, Essex on 9 May 1921.

Notes

Bibliography 
 
 
 
 
 

 

1904 ships
World War I cruisers of the United Kingdom
Topaze-class cruisers